Haïti Observateur is a US-based weekly newspaper founded in 1971 that focuses on news concerning Haiti. It is published in Brooklyn, New York, and has large distribution networks in other locations in the United States, as well in Canada and France. It was the first weekly newspaper for Haitian emigrants. Its main edition is in French, but it also publishes in English and Haitian Creole.

See also 
List of newspapers in New York
List of newspapers in Haiti

References

External links 
Haïti Observateur website (defunct)

1971 establishments in New York City
French-language newspapers published in the United States
Haitian-American culture in New York City
Haitian Creole-language mass media
Newspapers published in Brooklyn
Newspapers established in 1971